Ishq Junoon Dewangi is a Pakistani drama serial that aired on Hum TV in 2009. It was written and produced by Momina Duraid while directed by Babar Javed. The serial tells the story of a couple, when a director husband falls for the fictional character, written by his writer wife.

It was filmed in Mauritius and Cape Town, South Africa.

Cast
 Humayun Saeed as Sahil Sher; Seep's first husband
 Deepti Gupta as Seep; Sahil's wife
 Humaima Malick as Pares Usmani; Zain's wife
 Adnan Siddiqui as Zain Khan; Pares' husband
 Pooja Kumar as Mariam; Sahil's friend
 Ismail Bashey as Behram Omar; Sahil's friend and Seep's second husband
 Faysal Qureshi as Sahil's musician
 Nadia Hussain as Zain's girlfriend
 Aijaz Aslam

Broadcast
 Ishq Junoon Deewangi originally broadcast on Hum TV from May 15, 2009, to 16 October 2009.
 It was also aired in India on Zindagi, premiering on 20 January 2015.

Awards and nominations

9th Lux Style Awards
 Best TV Serial - Ishq Junoon Deewangi 
 Best TV Actor - Humayun Saeed
 Best TV Director - Babar Javed - Nominated

References

External links

2009 Pakistani television series debuts
2009 Pakistani television series endings
Pakistani drama television series
Urdu-language television shows
Hum TV original programming
2000s Pakistani television series
Zee Zindagi original programming